Takako Nakamoto  was a Japanese novelist and activist. She is best known for writing proletariat literature before World War II, and after the war, she became known for writing about political protests.

Early life and education 
Nakamoto was born in Yamaguchi prefecture on November 19, 1903. Her father was a retired army officer who taught physical education at a middle school. After graduating from Yamaguchi Koto Jogakko, she worked as an elementary school teacher in Yamaguchi.

Career 
In 1927, Nakamoto moved to Tokyo and wrote for the Nyonin Geijutsu. While living in Tokyo she incited textile workers to strike for the right to leave their hostel at night. After that she was arrested for her involvement with the Communist Party, but she did not officially join the party until 1960, after the changes to the Japanese government that happened after World War II. The stories she wrote during this period are often associated with the proletarian literature movement. She wrote  in 1937, which was one of the first books written about female prisoners.

Under pressure from the Japanese military government to produce works that support the war movement, she pivoted from writing proletarian literature to writing . These novels often focused on the experience of ironworkers.

In 1941, Nakamoto married Korehito Kurahara. They had two children.

After World War II, Nakamoto wrote about her experiences in prison and under police surveillance. She also began writing about protests and demonstrations, such as the Sunagawa struggle. Her book  was about her work protesting against the Treaty of Mutual Cooperation and Security Between the United States and Japan. Throughout her career her works were nominated for the Bungei Shunjun award, the Akutagawa Prize, and the 

Nakamoto died of bronchitis on September 28, 1991.

References 

1903 births
1991 deaths
20th-century Japanese novelists
20th-century Japanese women writers
Japanese activists
Japanese communists